Baba Banda Singh Bahadur Polytechnic College (BBSBPC), Fatehgarh Sahib, Punjab, India was established in 2006 by the Baba Banda Singh Bahadur Educational Trust formed under the patronage of Shiromani Gurdwara Parbandhak Committee with the approval of the Government of Punjab.

The college is approved by AICTE New Delhi, Government of India and is affiliated to the Punjab State Board Of Technical Education and Industrial Training, Chandigarh.

Three year diplomas
 Computer Science and Engineering
 Electronics and Communications Engineering
 Mechanical Engineering
 Civil Engineering
 Automobile Engineering

Location
The college is named after Baba Banda Singh Bahadur a saint and warrior; who conquered the Sirhind fort and laid to rest the tyranny of Mughal Empire.

External links
 Baba Banda Singh Bahadur Polytechnic College

All India Council for Technical Education
Fatehgarh Sahib